"Satellite" is a song by American Christian metal band P.O.D. and the title track of their fourth studio album, Satellite (2001), released on August 5, 2002, as the fourth and final single from the album.  The single's release was accompanied by a music video containing live footage of the band's performance at the Virginia Beach Amphitheater during FM99's Lunatic Luau 6 on July 21, 2002, as well as separate performance footage filmed in the woods.

Track listing
European and Australia CD single
 "Satellite"
 "Critic"
 "Youth of the Nation" (Mike$ki remix)

Charts

Release history

References

P.O.D. songs
2001 songs
2002 singles
Atlantic Records singles
Music videos directed by Marcos Siega
Song recordings produced by Howard Benson
Songs written by Marcos Curiel
Songs written by Noah Bernardo
Songs written by Sonny Sandoval
Songs written by Traa Daniels